Sukhodol is a rural locality in Soldatsky Selsoviet Rural Settlement, Fatezhsky District, Kursk Oblast, Russia. Population:

Geography 
The village is located in the Khalchi River basin (a link tributary of the Usozha in the basin of the Svapa), 87 km from the Russia–Ukraine border, 49 km north-west of Kursk, 15.5 km south-west of the district center – the town Fatezh, 9 km from the selsoviet center – Soldatskoye.

 Climate
Sukhodol has a warm-summer humid continental climate (Dfb in the Köppen climate classification).

Transport 
Sukhodol is located 14 km from the federal route  Crimea Highway as part of the European route E105, 9 km from the road of regional importance  (Fatezh – Dmitriyev), 4 km from the road of intermunicipal significance  (38K-038 – Soldatskoye – Shuklino), 0.5 km from the road  (38N-679 – Verkhniye Khalchi), 26.5 km from the nearest railway halt 552 km (railway line Navlya – Lgov-Kiyevsky).

The rural locality is situated 53 km from Kursk Vostochny Airport, 165 km from Belgorod International Airport and 248 km from Voronezh Peter the Great Airport.

References

Notes

Sources

Rural localities in Fatezhsky District